Henry Simpson may refer to:

 Henry Simpson (shipping) (1815–1884), merchant and ship owner in South Australia
 Henry Lakin Simpson (1859–1881), United States Navy sailor and Medal of Honor recipient
 Henry Simpson (Toronto) (1864–1926), architect in Toronto, Ontario
 Henry Simpson (Poets' Club founder) (died 1939), banker and the founder and president of the Poets' Club in London
 Henry George Simpson (1822–1898), member of the Queensland Legislative Council

See also
Harry Simpson (disambiguation)
Henry Simpson Lunn (1859–1939), English humanitarian and religious figure
Henry Simpson Newland (1873–1969), Australian surgeon
Henry Simson (1872–1932), British physician who became obstetrician to the royal family
Henry L. Stimson (1867–1950), American statesman and lawyer